Simon Lyle Wi Rutene (born 10 March 1966) is an alpine skier from New Zealand. He has competed for New Zealand at four Olympics. He decided to be a ski racer at 12, and went to a U.S. ski resort on his own. At 16 he was sponsored, and did his first downhill run at Wengen, Switzerland.

In the 1984 Winter Olympics at Sarajevo, he came 36th in the Giant Slalom.

In the 1988 Winter Olympics at Calgary, he came 17th in the Slalom. He was the flagbearer at the opening ceremony.

In the 1992 Winter Olympics at Albertville, he came 42nd in the Super G and 28th in the Giant Slalom.

In the 1994 Winter Olympics at Lillehammer, he came 20th in skiing combined, 23rd in the Downhill Combined and 18th in the Slalom Combined.

Wi Rutene retired from skiing in 1998.

Wi Rutene is an enrolled barrister and solicitor of the High Court of New Zealand and holds a Bachelor of Commerce in Maori business and a Post Graduate certificate in career counselling psychology.

Politics 
In the 2005 general election he was a list candidate for the Māori Party. He was ranked fourth on the party list. The party gained four MPs at that election, but all from electorate seats and Wi Rutene was not elected.

References 

 Mountain Mover by Bruce Ansley in The New Zealand Listener, 29 August 1987, pp. 20–23 Volume 118 No 2480.
 Black Gold by Ron Palenski (2008, 2004 New Zealand Sports Hall of Fame, Dunedin) p. 108

External links 
 
 

Living people
1966 births
New Zealand male alpine skiers
Olympic alpine skiers of New Zealand
Alpine skiers at the 1984 Winter Olympics
Alpine skiers at the 1988 Winter Olympics
Alpine skiers at the 1992 Winter Olympics
Alpine skiers at the 1994 Winter Olympics
Māori Party politicians
21st-century New Zealand politicians
New Zealand Māori sportspeople
Unsuccessful candidates in the 2005 New Zealand general election
New Zealand sportsperson-politicians